Star City was a silver-mining boom town in present-day Pershing County, Nevada. It was located in the Star Mining District.  It is now a ghost town.

The site is marked as Nevada Historical Marker 231.

History
Star City was established in 1861 when rich silver ore deposits were discovered in the area. During its height from 1864 to 1865 the town was home to 1,200 people. It also housed two hotels, three general stores, a Wells-Fargo office, a church and more than a dozen saloons.  The Post Office was in operation from April 1862 to September 1868.  The largest mine in the Star Mining District was the Sheba Mine, which produced about $5 million in silver by 1868. That same year the ore deposit began to run out.  An 1868 account remarks on Star City: "So sudden was its decline that the daily mail, the express office and the telegraph office are all in operation yet, though the entire population consists of a single family."

By 1871, only 78 people remained in Star City. Today the only reminders of the town are crumbling foundations and rusted mill equipment.

A map references Star City on an early Map of the Overland Railroad route for the Central Pacific Railroad as "Ostar City," between Humboldt and Humboldt Wells, Nevada by mistake.

References 

1861 establishments in Nevada Territory
Ghost towns in Nevada
Ghost towns in Pershing County, Nevada
Nevada historical markers
Mining communities in Nevada
Populated places established in 1861